Claudio Di Coste (born 13 August 1954) is a retired Italian volleyball player. He was part of Italian teams that finished second at the 1978 World Championships and ninth at the 1980 Summer Olympics.

References

1954 births
Living people
Olympic volleyball players of Italy
Volleyball players at the 1980 Summer Olympics
Italian men's volleyball players